Minuscule 323 (in the Gregory-Aland numbering), α 157 (Soden), is a Greek minuscule manuscript of the New Testament, on parchment. Palaeographically it has been assigned to the 12th century.
Formerly it was designated by 29a and 35p.

Description 

The codex contains the text of the Acts of the Apostles, Catholic epistles, and Pauline epistles on 374 parchment leaves with some lacunae. The text is written in one column per page, in 18 lines per page. The texts of Acts 1:1-8; 2:36-45 were supplied by a later hand. There are other small defects. It is beautifully but carelessly written, without subscriptions at the end of books.

Text 

The Greek text of the codex is a representative of the Alexandrian text-type, but the Byzantine element is very strong. Aland assigned it to Category II in Catholic epistles, and to Category III elsewhere. Textually it is very close to the codex 322, as a sister manuscript.

It is a member of the textual family 1739.

In Acts 8:37 it has an additional verse together with the manuscripts Codex Laudianus, 453, 945, 1739, 1891, 2818 (formerly 36a), and several others.

In Acts 8:39 it has addition  (the holy spirit fell on the eunuch, and an angel caught up Philip). This reading is supported by the manuscripts Codex Alexandrinus, 453, 945, 1739, 1891, 2818, itp, vg, syrh, and several others.

History 

The manuscript was brought from Greece. It was examined by Mill, Griesbach, and Scholz. C. R. Gregory saw it in 1883.

Formerly it was designated by 29a and 35p. In 1908 Gregory gave the number 323 to it.

The manuscript is currently housed in the Bibliothèque de Genève (Gr. 20) in Geneva.

See also 

 List of New Testament minuscules
 Biblical manuscript
 Textual criticism

References

Further reading 

 W. J. Elliott, The Relationship between 322 and 323 of the Greek New Testament, JTS 18 (1967), pp. 423–25.

External links 
 Minuscule 323 at the Encyclopedia of Textual Criticism

Greek New Testament minuscules
12th-century biblical manuscripts